This is a list of listed buildings in Helsingør Municipality, Denmark.

The list

3060 Espergærde

3999 Helsingør

3100  Hornbæk

3140 Ålsgårde

3150 Hellebæk

3490 Kvistgård

References

External links

 Danish Agency of Culture

 
Helsingor